Boudghene Ben Ali Lotfi Airport  is an airport located 5 km north of Béchar, a city in the Béchar Province of Algeria.

Airlines and destinations

Statistics

See also
List of airports in Algeria
Béchar Ouakda aerodrome
Benali Boudghene

References

External links 
 
 
 

Airports in Algeria
Buildings and structures in Béchar Province